Miami Avenue is a  main north–south street running through Coconut Grove, Brickell, Downtown, and Midtown in Miami, Florida. It is the meridian road dividing the street grid of Miami and Miami-Dade County into east and west avenues.

Route description

The southern terminus is on South Bayshore Drive in the Coconut Grove neighborhood of Miami at Alatka Street/Mercy Way in front of Mercy Hospital. It is one way northbound from South 15th Road to South Fourth Street. It is one way southbound from North 17th Street to the Miami River downtown where it curves onto South First Avenue. At Flagler Street, the latitudinal baseline north–south road of the Miami area, extends from the central business district of downtown Miami to the west Miami-Dade, South Miami Avenue becomes North Miami Avenue. North of North 17th Street it is two way and continues north through the city of Miami until it crosses the Little River Canal after North 85th Street and enters the village of El Portal.

It continues north through El Portal a short distance until it crosses North 90th Street and enters the village of Miami Shores. It continues north through Miami Shores until it crosses North 115th Street and enters unincorporated Miami-Dade County. It continues north through Miami-Dade County until it crosses North 167th Street and enters the city of North Miami Beach where it continues north a short distance to North 173rd Street at a dead end near the Golden Glades Interchange.

The road resumes north from Miami Gardens Drive, terminating at Ives Dairy Road.

Brickell
In Brickell, Miami Avenue is Brickell's main restaurant and nightlife avenue, with many bars, restaurants, and lounges, including the now-demolished Tobacco Road.

Major intersections
Miami Avenue is the dividing line between Northwest and Northeast streets.

See also 
 Brickell Avenue
 Biscayne Boulevard
 Flagler Street
 Brickell
 Downtown Miami

Gallery

References

Roads in Miami
Roads in Miami-Dade County, Florida
Shopping districts and streets in the United States
1920 establishments in Florida